Chalcopsitta is a genus of parrot in the family Psittaculidae and the subfamily Loriinae. All three species are native to New Guinea and western offshore islands. The name Chalcopsitta is derived from the Greek khalkos meaning "bronze" and psitta meaning "parrot".

Description
The three species of the genus Chalcopsitta are about 31 –  long. They have long tails, and prominent bare skin at the base of the lower mandible. Males and females have similar external appearance, and juveniles have duller plumage with more marked bare eye-rings.

Taxonomy
The genus Chalcopsitta was introduced in 1850 by the French naturalist Charles Lucien Bonaparte. The name combines the Ancient Greek khalkos meaning "bronze" with the Modern Latin psitta meaning "parrot". The type species was designated by George Robert Gray in 1855 as the black lory.

Species
The genus contains three species:

References

Cited texts
Collar N (1997) "Family Psittacidae (Parrots)" in Handbook of the Birds of the World Volume 4; Sandgrouse to Cuckoos (eds del Hoyo J, Elliott A, Sargatal J) Lynx Edicions:Barcelona.

External links

 
Psittacidae
Birds described in 1850
Bird genera
 
Taxa named by Charles Lucien Bonaparte
Taxonomy articles created by Polbot